Amar is a village in Porbandar district, which forms a part of the state of Gujarat, India. At the 2001 census, the population of the Porbandar district was 536,835.

References  

Villages in Porbandar district